Mr. T (born Laurence Tureaud, May 21, 1952), is an American actor. He is known for his roles as B. A. Baracus in the 1980s television series The A-Team and as boxer Clubber Lang in the 1982 film Rocky III. He is also known for his distinctive hairstyle inspired by Mandinka warriors in West Africa, his copious gold jewelry, his tough-guy persona and his catchphrase "I pity the fool!", first uttered as Clubber Lang in Rocky III, then turned into a trademark used in slogans or titles, like the reality show I Pity the Fool in 2006.

Early life
Mr. T was born Laurence Tureaud in Chicago, Illinois, the youngest son in a family with twelve children. Tureaud, with his four sisters and seven brothers, grew up in a three-room apartment in the Robert Taylor Homes. His father, Nathaniel Tureaud, was a minister. After his father left when he was five, he shortened his name to Lawrence Tero. In 1970, he legally changed his last name to T. His new name, Mr. T., was based upon his childhood impressions regarding the lack of respect from white people for his family:

I think about my father being called 'boy', my uncle being called 'boy', my brother, coming back from Vietnam and being called 'boy'. So I questioned myself: "What does a black man have to do before he's given respect as a man?" So when I was 18 years old, when I was old enough to fight and die for my country, old enough to drink, old enough to vote, I said I was old enough to be called a man. I self-ordained myself Mr. T, so the first word out of everybody's mouth is "Mr."

Tureaud attended Dunbar Vocational High School, where he played football, wrestled, and studied martial arts. While at Dunbar he became the citywide wrestling champion two years in a row. He won a football scholarship to Prairie View A&M University, where he majored in mathematics, but was expelled after his first year.

After Tureaud left Prairie View A&M, he worked as a gym instructor for a government program in Chicago. He later said it was here that he discovered a gift for helping children.

He then enlisted in the United States Army in 1975 and served in the Military Police Corps. After his discharge in the late 1970s, he tried out for the Green Bay Packers of the National Football League, but failed to make the team due to a knee injury.

Tureaud next worked as a bouncer at the Rush Street club Dingbats Discotheque. It was at this time that he created the persona of Mr. T. His wearing of gold neck chains and other jewelry was the result of customers losing the items or leaving them behind at the night club after a fight. A banned customer, or one reluctant to risk a confrontation by going back inside, could return to claim his property from Mr. T wearing it conspicuously right out front. Along with controlling the violence as a doorman, Tureaud was mainly hired to keep out drug dealers and users. Tureaud claims that as a bouncer, he was in over 200 fights and was sued a number of times, but won each case.

He eventually parlayed his job as a bouncer into a career as a bodyguard that lasted almost ten years. As his reputation grew, he was contracted to guard, among others, clothes designers, models, judges, politicians, athletes and millionaires. His clients included celebrities such as Steve McQueen, Michael Jackson, LeVar Burton, and Diana Ross, and boxers such as Muhammad Ali, Joe Frazier, and Leon Spinks. With his reputation as "Mr. T", Tureaud attracted strange offers and was frequently approached with odd commissions, including tracking runaway teenagers, locating missing persons, debt collection, and assassination requests.

While he was in his late twenties, Tureaud won two tough-man competitions consecutively. The first aired as "Sunday Games" on NBC-TV under the contest of "America's Toughest Bouncer" which included throwing a  stuntman, and breaking through a  wooden door. For the first event, Tureaud came in third place. For the end, two finalists squared off in a boxing ring for a two-minute round to declare the champion. Making it to the ring as a finalist, he had as his opponent a  Honolulu bouncer named Tutefano Tufi. Within twenty seconds "Mr. T" gave the six foot five competitor a bloody nose, and later a bloody mouth. He won the match and thus the competition. The second competition was aired under the new name "Games People Play" on NBC-TV. When interviewed by Bryant Gumbel before the final boxing match, Mr T. said, "I just feel sorry for the guy who I have to box. I just feel real sorry for him." This fight was scheduled to last three rounds, but Mr. T finished it in less than 54 seconds. The line, "I don't hate him but... I pity the fool" in the movie Rocky III was written by Sylvester Stallone, who is reputed to have been inspired by the interview.

Acting roles and other work

While reading National Geographic, Mr. T first noticed the unusual hairstyle for which he is now famous, on a Mandinka warrior. He decided that adoption of the style would be a powerful statement about his African origin. It was a simpler, safer, and more permanent visual signature than his gold chains, rings, and bracelets.

In 1980, Mr. T was spotted by Sylvester Stallone while taking part in NBC's "America's Toughest Bouncer" competition, a segment of NBC's Games People Play. Although his role in Rocky III was originally intended as just a few lines, Mr. T was eventually cast as Clubber Lang, the primary antagonist. His catchphrase "I pity the fool!" comes from the film; when asked if he hates Rocky, Lang replies, "No, I don't hate Balboa, but I pity the fool." He subsequently appeared in another boxing film, Penitentiary 2, and on an episode of the Canadian sketch comedy series Bizarre, where he fights and eats Super Dave Osborne, before accepting a television series role on The A-Team. He also appeared in an episode of Silver Spoons, reprising his old role as bodyguard to the character Ricky Stratton (played by Ricky Schroder). In the episode, he explains his name as "First name: Mister; middle name: period; last name T." In one scene, when Ricky's class erupts into a paper-ball-throwing melee, Mr. T throws his body in front of the flying papers.

In The A-Team, he played Sergeant Bosco "B. A." Baracus, an ex-Army commando on the run with three other members from the United States government "for a crime they didn't commit." As well as the team's tough guy, B. A. was a mechanical genius, but afraid of flying. When asked at a press conference whether he was as stupid as B. A. Baracus, Mr. T observed quietly, "It takes a smart guy to play dumb." The series was a major hit, and B. A. Baracus in particular quickly became a cult character and the de facto star of the show, reportedly sparking tensions with seasoned actor George Peppard, although Mr. T always maintained that these were unfounded rumors. Mr. T was reported to be earning $80,000 a week for his role in The A-Team.

His role in The A-Team led to him making an appearance in the long-running sit-com Diff'rent Strokes in the sixth season opener "Mr. T and Mr. t" (1983), in which an episode of The A-Team is supposedly filmed in the family's penthouse apartment. 

Also in 1983, a Ruby-Spears-produced cartoon called Mister T premiered on NBC. The Mister T cartoon starred Mr. T as his alter ego, the owner of a gym where a group of gymnasts trained. He helped them with their training but they also helped him solve mysteries and fight crime in Scooby-Doo-style scenarios; thirty episodes were produced. Each episode was bookended by Mr. T himself, presenting the theme of the episode, and then a closing statement on a lesson for children, based on the events of the episode.

The year 1983 also marked the release of the only film that can be called a Mr. T vehicle, DC Cab. The movie featured an ensemble cast, many of whom were publicized figures from other areas of show business – comics Paul Rodriguez, Marsha Warfield, singer Irene Cara, bodybuilders David and Peter Paul (the "Barbarian Brothers") – but who had only modest acting experience. Despite the wide range of performers, and more seasoned actors such as Adam Baldwin as the protagonist Albert, as well as Gary Busey and Max Gail, Mr. T was top billed and the central figure in the film's publicity, with him literally towering over the other characters on the film's poster. While the film, featuring the ensemble as a ragtag taxi company trying to hustle their way to solvency and respectability, performed modestly at the box office, its $16 million take exceeded its $12 million budget, it received mixed reviews critically. Janet Maslin, writing for The New York Times, described it as "a musical mob scene, a raucous, crowded movie that's fun as long as it stays wildly busy, and a lot less interesting when it wastes time on plot or conversation." Roger Ebert praised the movie's "mindless, likable confusion" and criticized its "fresh off the assembly line" plot. It was the second feature in a prolific career for director Joel Schumacher.

In 1984, he made a motivational video called Be Somebody... or Be Somebody's Fool!. He gives helpful advice to children throughout the video; for example, he teaches them how to understand and appreciate their origins, how to dress fashionably without buying designer labels, how to make tripping up look like breakdancing, how to control their anger, and how to deal with peer pressure. The video is roughly one hour long, but contains 30 minutes of singing, either by the group of children accompanying him, or by Mr. T himself. He sings "Treat Your Mother Right (Treat Her Right)," and also raps a song about growing up in the ghetto and praising God. The raps in this video were written by Ice-T. Due to its unintentionally comic nature, many clips have been made from this video and shared as Internet memes. Also in 1984, he played the protagonist of the TV movie The Toughest Man in the World, as Bruise Brubaker, a bouncer also leading a sports center for teenagers, who takes part in a strong man championship to get funds for the center. He also released a rap mini-album called Mr. T's Commandments (Columbia/CBS Records) the same year, featuring seven songs, including the title theme for the aforementioned TV movie. In much the same tone as his motivational video, it instructed children to stay in school and to stay away from drugs. He followed it up the same year with a second album, titled Mr. T's Be Somebody... or Be Somebody's Fool! (MCA Records), featuring music from the eponymous film.

During those busy years, he made numerous appearances in television shows, most notably hosting the 15th episode of the 10th season of Saturday Night Live, along with Hulk Hogan. He had previously appeared on Saturday Night Live (season 8) in October 1982, fresh from his role in Rocky III, in a recurring skit by Eddie Murphy called "Mr. Robinson Neighborhood" (making a reference to one of his lines in the movie : "Hello boys and girls. The new word for today... is PAIN.").

On January 19, 1985, he introduced Rich Little at the nationally televised 50th Presidential Inaugural Gala, the day before the second inauguration of Ronald Reagan.

In 1988, after the cancellation of The A-Team, Mr. T starred in the syndicated Canadian television series T. and T.  
Earning $15,000 for personal appearances, by the end of the 1990s, he was appearing only in the occasional commercial, largely because of health problems.

Some time during the 90's, Mr. T would be in Eric "Butterbean" Esch's corner in the boxing matches during one of the Toughman Contests.

He frequently appears on the TBN Christian television network.

In 2002, Mr. T appeared as a bartender in the video for "Pass the Courvoisier, Part II" by Busta Rhymes featuring Sean Combs and Pharrell Williams.

In the 2009 animated movie Cloudy with a Chance of Meatballs, Mr. T provided the voice for Officer Earl Devereaux, the town's athletic cop who loves his son very much. Mr. T was offered a cameo appearance in the film adaptation of The A-Team, but decided to turn it down, whereas Dwight Schultz and Dirk Benedict both made cameos in the film. These scenes were shown after the credits, but were reinserted during the film in the Extended Cut. Although he wasn't disturbed at the mere prospect of an "A-Team" movie being made without him, he vehemently criticized the concept of having another actor copy his own very distinct appearance and style (including his haircut and gold chains) in the hope of attracting his nostalgic fanbase, and considered that asking him to do a cameo appearance in those conditions was disrespectful.

Starting in 2011, Mr. T presented a clip show on BBC Three named World's Craziest Fools. The show featured stories such as botched bank robberies and inept insurance fraudsters alongside fail videos. In 2015, it was announced that Mr. T would star in a do it yourself home improvement TV show, with interior designer Tiffany Brooks, on the DIY Network. The show, due sometime in 2015, was to be titled, "I Pity the Tool", another variation on his famous catchphrase, but only one episode was aired, for reasons unknown.

On March 1, 2017, Mr. T was revealed as one of the contestants who would compete on season 24 of Dancing with the Stars. He was paired with professional dancer Kym Herjavec. On April 10, 2017, Mr. T and Herjavec were the third couple to be eliminated from the competition, finishing in 10th place. He vowed to donate the money received from this participation to the Saint Jude Children's Research Hospital and the Shriners Hospitals for Children.

Commercials 
Mr. T has been involved in numerous commercials, including for Snickers, World of Warcraft, MCI, Comcast, and RadioShack.  Forbes has described him as "one of the most enduring pitchmen in the business." Mr. T has described himself as "not really an actor, I'm a reactor; I'm a pitchman." At his peak, he was earning $5 million per year.

Mr. T did a video campaign for Hitachi's Data Systems that was created and posted on consumer video sites including YouTube and Yahoo! Video. According to Steven Zivanic, senior director and corporate communications of HDS, "this campaign has not only helped the firm in its own area, but it has given the data storage firm a broader audience." In November 2007, Mr. T appeared in a television commercial for the online role playing game World of Warcraft with the phrase "I'm Mr. T and I'm a Night Elf Mohawk". A follow-up to this commercial appeared in November 2009 where he appeared promoting the "mohawk grenade" item, which appears in game and turns other players into Mr. T's likeness.

In 2008, Mr. T appeared on the American channel Shopping TV selling his "Mr. T Flavorwave Oven". In 2009, ZootFly announced they had acquired the rights to the Mr. T Graphic Novel and were planning several video games based upon the work. The first (and only) game, "Mr. T: The Videogame", was to have Mr. T battle Nazis in various locations and guest star Wil Wright. It was planned to be available on the Xbox 360, PS3, Wii and PC platforms, however the game was cancelled for undisclosed reasons.

The same year, he appeared on commercials in the United Kingdom, Ireland, Australia, and New Zealand advertising the chocolate bar Snickers with the slogan "Get Some Nuts!" One of these commercials featured Mr. T on an army jeep calling a speed walker wearing yellow shorts "a disgrace to the man race" (a pun on the double meaning of the word "race") and firing Snickers bars at the man with a custom-made machine gun so that he starts "running like a real man". This commercial was pulled by Mars following a complaint by the U.S.-based group Human Rights Campaign, although the advert had never been shown in the United States. The group alleged that the commercial promoted the idea that violence against gay, lesbian, bisexual and transgender people "is not only acceptable, but humorous." Mr. T distanced himself from these accusations, insisting that he would never lend his name to such beliefs, and that he did not think the commercial was offensive to anyone, as all the commercials he appeared in had a similarly silly, over-the-top nature and were never intended to be taken seriously.

In 2010, Mr. T signed up as the spokesman for Gold Promise, a gold-buying company. According to an appraiser hired by Bloomberg Television's Taking Stock, his trademark gold jewelry was worth around $43,000 in 1983, although some sources claim the gold jewelry was worth up to $300,000.

In 2015, he starred in a series of Fuze Iced Tea advertisements, stating, "The only thing bolder than Fuze Iced Tea is ME!" The brand, owned by Coca-Cola, also briefly centered its social profiles and website around Mr. T.

Professional wrestling
Mr. T entered the world of professional wrestling in 1985. He was Hulk Hogan's tag-team partner at the World Wrestling Federation's (WWF) WrestleMania I which he won. Hulk Hogan wrote in his autobiography that Mr. T saved the main event of WrestleMania I between them and "Rowdy" Roddy Piper and "Mr. Wonderful" Paul Orndorff because when he arrived, security would not let his entourage into the building. Mr. T was ready to skip the show until Hogan personally talked him out of leaving. Piper has said that he and other fellow wrestlers disliked Mr. T because he was an actor and had never paid his dues as a professional wrestler. Remaining with the WWF, Mr. T became a special "WWF boxer" in light of his character in Rocky III. He took on "Cowboy" Bob Orton on the March 1, 1986 Saturday Night's Main Event V, on NBC. This boxing stunt culminated in another boxing match against Roddy Piper at WrestleMania 2. As part of the build-up for the match, Piper attacked Mr. T's friend, midget wrestler the Haiti Kid on his Piper's Pit interview slot, shaving his head into a mohican style similar to that of Mr. T. Then Mr. T won the boxing match in Round 4 by Disqualification after Piper attacked the referee and bodyslammed Mr. T. He returned to the World Wrestling Federation as a special guest referee in 1987 as well as a special referee enforcer confronting such stars as The Honky Tonk Man.

On July 21, 1989, Mr. T. made an appearance in World Class Championship Wrestling (WCCW), seconding Kerry Von Erich. Five years later, Mr. T reappeared in WCW, first appearing in Hulk Hogan's corner for his WCW world title match against Ric Flair at Bash at the Beach 1994. He would next appear as a special referee for the HoganFlair rematch in October 1994 at Halloween Havoc, and then went on to wrestle again, defeating Kevin Sullivan at that year's Starrcade. Another seven years later Mr. T appeared in the front row of the November 19, 2001, episode of WWF Raw. On April 5, 2014, at the Smoothie King Center in New Orleans, Mr. T was inducted by Gene Okerlund into the WWE Hall of Fame's celebrity wing. His acceptance speech, largely a tribute to his mother and motherhood rather than wrestling, ran long and was eventually interrupted by Kane.

Personal life

Mr. T is a born-again Christian. Mr. T has three children; two daughters, one of whom is a comedian, and a son from his ex-wife.

In 1987, he angered the residents of Lake Forest, Illinois, by cutting down more than a hundred oak trees on his estate. The local newspaper referred to the incident as "the Lake Forest Chain Saw Massacre".

In 1995, he was diagnosed with a cutaneous T-cell lymphoma, or mycosis fungoides. Once in remission, he joked about the coincidence: "Can you imagine that? Cancer with my name on it — personalized cancer! " He wrote an as-yet unpublished book on this experience, called Cancer Saved My Life (Cancer Ain't For No Wimps). He made a direct reference to it as he performed a waltz to the song Amazing Grace in Dancing with the Stars.

He stopped wearing virtually all his gold, one of his identifying marks, after helping with the cleanup after Hurricane Katrina in 2005. He said, "As a Christian, when I saw other people lose their lives and lose their land and property ... I felt that it would be a sin before God for me to continue wearing my gold. I felt it would be insensitive and disrespectful to the people who lost everything, so I stopped wearing my gold."

Mr. T often refers to himself in the third person. He also frequently talks in rhymes. He cites Muhammad Ali as his "childhood hero" and his main inspiration with regard to style and mannerisms.

In popular culture
 
The pop punk band The Mr. T Experience is named after him.

Mr. T was featured in the Epic Rap Battles of History episode Mr. T vs. Mr. Rogers, in which he was portrayed by DeStorm Power.

Filmography

Film

Television

See also 
 Mr. T Cereal

References

Bibliography

External links

 
 

 
1952 births
Living people
20th-century American male actors
20th-century Christians
21st-century American male actors
21st-century Christians
African-American Christians
African-American male actors
African-American male professional wrestlers
African-American television personalities
American autobiographers
American male film actors
American male professional wrestlers
American male television actors
American male voice actors
American military police officers
Bodyguards
Columbia Records artists
Dunbar Vocational High School alumni
Illeists
Male actors from Chicago
Military personnel from Illinois
Prairie View A&M Panthers football players
Professional wrestling referees
Sportspeople from Chicago
United States Army soldiers
Writers from Chicago
WWE Hall of Fame inductees